Crematogaster coarctata is a species of ant in tribe Crematogastrini. It was described by Austrian entomologist Gustav Mayr in 1870.

References

coarctata
Insects described in 1870